Adam Lars Eriksson (born 13 July 1990) is a Swedish footballer who plays for Falkenbergs FF as a defender.

He signed for Helsingborgs IF from Falkenbergs FF before the start of the 2016 season.

References

External links
 
 

1990 births
Living people
People from Borås
Association football defenders
Swedish footballers
Norrby IF players
Falkenbergs FF players
Helsingborgs IF players
Ettan Fotboll players
Superettan players
Allsvenskan players
Sportspeople from Västra Götaland County